Boggs Peak is a  mountain summit located in the Chugach Mountains, in Anchorage Municipality in the U.S. state of Alaska.

The mountain's name was officially adopted in 1976 by the United States Geological Survey to commemorate Hale Boggs (1914-1972), who was the House majority leader of the U.S. House of Representatives when he disappeared along with Congressman Nick Begich and two others on October 16, 1972, during an airplane flight from Anchorage to Juneau. Neither the plane's wreckage nor the pilot's and passengers' remains were ever found.

Climate

Based on the Köppen climate classification, Boggs Peak is located in a subarctic climate zone with cold, snowy winters, and mild summers. Temperatures can drop below −20 °C with wind chill factors below −30 °C. May and June are the best months for climbing in terms of catching favorable weather. Precipitation runoff from the mountain drains into tributaries of Portage Creek and Twentymile River before emptying into Turnagain Arm.

See also

List of mountain peaks of Alaska
Geology of Alaska

References

External links

 Boggs Peak weather forecast

Mountains of Alaska
Mountains of Anchorage, Alaska
North American 1000 m summits